El Casino de Ferrol is a historical edifice in Ferrol, Spain, created as a social catalyst to satisfy the social needs of the 19th century incipient local bourgeoisie and upper classes. 

The city and naval station of Ferrol was going to be the cradle of the Spanish Socialist Workers Movement as well as the Spanish Feminist Movement. 

Since the 1980s, El Casino de Ferrol took over in a joined venture another historical institution in the same city: El Cub de Tenis de Ferrol. Together, they formed El Casino Ferrolano Tenis Club and all points up at the beginning of the 21st century to a harmonious long lasting future together.

El Casino de Ferrol, like any other institution in modern Spain, has its membership open to any one to join in.

See also 
Club Naval de Ferrol 
El Circulo Mercantil de Ferrol

External links 

  The Building of “El Casino de Ferrol” is a 19th century listed building with  Art deco paintings   
  “El Casino de Madrid” is also a 19th century institution belonging to Spanish Society of Casinos  
  Web page devoted to the study of the “Modernist Architecture” and “Modernisme” in Ferrol (North-western Spain)  

Gentlemen's clubs in Spain
Art museums and galleries in Spain
Buildings and structures in Galicia (Spain)
Modernisme architecture
Art Nouveau architecture in Spain